Jackson Irving Cope (1 September 1925 - 6 August 1999) was Leo S. Bing professor emeritus of English at the University of Southern California.

Selected publications
The Theater and the Dream: From Metaphor to Form in Renaissance Drama
The Metaphoric Structure of Paradise Lost. Johns Hopkins Press, 1962.
Dramaturgy of the Daemonic: Studies in Antigeneric Theater from Ruzante to Grimaldi
Joseph Glanvill: Anglican Apologist
Secret sharers in Italian comedy: from Machiavelli to Goldoni. Duke University Press, Durham, N.C., 1996.

References 

1925 births
1999 deaths
University of Southern California faculty
Johns Hopkins University alumni